This article is a list of notable shopping malls in Canada by province.

Canada's first indoor mall was the Lister Block, originally opened in 1852, in Hamilton, Ontario. The Lister Block was destroyed by fire and rebuilt in 1924. In 2011 the building was completely rebuilt.

Opened in 1949, the first shopping mall in Canada is the Norgate shopping centre, a strip mall in Saint-Laurent, Montreal, Quebec. The first enclosed shopping mall was the Park Royal Shopping Centre in West Vancouver, British Columbia, which opened a year later, in 1950.

Alberta

Calgary

 Bankers Hall
 Chinook Centre
 The CORE Shopping Centre
 CrossIron Mills
 Deerfoot City
 Market Mall
 Marlborough Mall
 New Horizon Mall
 North Hill Centre
 Northland Village Mall
 Southcentre Mall
 Stephen Avenue Place (formerly Scotia Centre)
Sunridge Mall
 Westbrook Mall

Edmonton 
 Bonnie Doon Shopping Centre
 Commerce Place
 Edmonton City Centre
 Kingsway Mall
 Londonderry Mall
 Manulife Place
 Mill Woods Town Centre
 North Town Centre
 Northgate Centre
 Southgate Centre
 West Edmonton Mall — largest mall in North America and 18th largest in the world
 Westmount Centre

Other Alberta malls 

 Hinton
 Parks West Mall
 Lethbridge
 Melcor Centre (originally Lethbridge Centre)
 Park Place Mall
Medicine Hat
Medicine Hat Mall
Red Deer
Bower Place
St. Albert
St. Albert Centre
Sherwood Park
Sherwood Park Mall

Atlantic Canada

New Brunswick
 Dieppe
 Bass Pro Complex
Champlain Place
 Moncton
Highfield Square (defunct)
Saint John
 McAllister Place

Newfoundland and Labrador
Carbonear
 Trinity-Conception Square — on Route 70
 Labrador City
 Labrador Mall
 St. John's
 Avalon Mall — on Kenmount Road
 Village Mall — on Topsail Road

Nova Scotia
 Halifax region
 Bedford
 Sunnyside Mall
 Dartmouth
 Dartmouth Crossing
 Mic Mac Mall
 Halifax
 Halifax Shopping Centre
 Maritime Mall (Maritime Centre)
 Park Lane
 Scotia Square
 Sydney
 Mayflower Mall

Prince Edward Island 

 Charlottetown
 SmartCentres Charlottetown
 Summerside

British Columbia

Greater Vancouver
 Burnaby
 Brentwood Town Centre
 Crystal Mall
 Lougheed Town Centre
 Metropolis at Metrotown — fifth largest mall in Canada
 Station Square
 City of North Vancouver
 Capilano Mall
 Lonsdale Quay
 Coquitlam
 Coquitlam Centre
 Henderson Place Mall
 Delta
 Tsawwassen Mills
 District of North Vancouver
 Edgemont Village
 Langley Township
Willowbrook Shopping Centre
New Westminster
Shops at New West
 Richmond
 Aberdeen Centre
 Lansdowne Centre
 Parker Place
 Richmond Centre
 Surrey
 Central City
 Guildford Town Centre
 South Surrey/White Rock
 Semiahmoo Shopping Centre
 West Vancouver
 Park Royal Shopping Centre — first enclosed shopping centre in Canada
 Vancouver
 Bentall Centre  	
 City Square Shopping Centre
 Harbour Centre
 Oakridge Centre — closed until 2024
 Pacific Centre
 Royal Centre
 Sinclair Centre

Vancouver Island
 Nanaimo
 Port Place Shopping Centre
 Woodgrove Centre
 Port Alberni
 Alberni Mall
 Pacific Rim Shopping Centre
 Victoria/Greater Victoria
 Bay Centre
 Hillside Shopping Centre
 Market Square
 Mayfair Shopping Centre
 Tillicum Centre
 Westshore Town Centre (formerly Can West Mall)

Fraser Valley and BC Interior 
 Abbotsford
 Sevenoaks Shopping Centre

 Kelowna
 Orchard Park Shopping Centre
 Penticton
 Cherry Lane Shopping Centre

Manitoba
 Winnipeg
 Cityplace
 Garden City Shopping Centre
 Grant Park Shopping Centre
 Kildonan Place
 Outlet Collection Winnipeg
  Polo Park Shopping Centre — 15th largest mall in Canada
 Portage Place 
 St. Vital Centre
 Shops of Winnipeg Square — underground mall
Unicity Mall (defunct)
 Brandon
 Brandon Shoppers Mall

Ontario

Central and Eastern Ontario 
 Barrie
 Georgian Mall

 Kingston
 Cataraqui Town Centre

 Peterborough
 Lansdowne Place

Golden Horseshoe
 Brampton
 Bramalea City Centre
 Shoppers World Brampton
 Burlington
 Burlington Centre
 Mapleview Centre
 Hamilton
 Centre Mall
 Eastgate Square
 Jackson Square
 Lime Ridge Mall
 Markham
 Market Village
 Markville Shopping Centre
 Pacific Mall
 First Markham Place
 Mississauga
 Dixie Outlet Mall
Heartland Town Centre
 Erin Mills Town Centre
 Sheridan Centre
 Square One Shopping Centre
Westwood Square Mall
 Newmarket
 Upper Canada Mall
 Niagara-on-the-Lake
 Outlet Collection at Niagara
 Oakville
 Oakville Place
 Oshawa
 Oshawa Centre
 Pickering
 Pickering Town Centre
 Richmond Hill
 Hillcrest Mall
 St. Catharines
 The Pen Centre
 Vaughan
 Improve Canada
 The Promenade Shopping Centre
 Vaughan Mills
 Welland
 Seaway Mall

Northern Ontario
 Northeastern Ontario
 Elliot Lake
 Pearson Plaza
 Sault Ste. Marie
 Station Mall
 Sudbury
 New Sudbury Centre
 Temiskaming Shores
 Timiskaming Square
 Timmins
 Timmins Square
 Northwestern Ontario
 Thunder Bay
 Intercity Shopping Centre

Ottawa

 Bayshore Shopping Centre
 Billings Bridge Plaza
 Carlingwood Mall
 College Square
 Elmvale Acres Shopping Centre
 Fairlawn Centre
 Freiman Mall
 Hazeldean Mall
 Lincoln Fields Shopping Centre (defunct)
 Merivale Mall
 Place d'Orléans
 Rideau Centre
 St. Laurent Shopping Centre
 Westgate Shopping Centre

Southwestern Ontario
 Cambridge
 Cambridge Centre
 Guelph
 Stone Road Mall
 Kitchener
 Fairview Park Mall
 London
 Masonville Place
 Westmount Mall
 White Oaks Mall
 Sarnia
 Lambton Mall
 Waterloo
 Conestoga Mall
 Windsor
 Devonshire Mall

Toronto

Quebec

Montreal
 1000 de la Gauchetière
 Carrefour Angrignon (LaSalle)
 Centre Eaton (Ville-Marie, Downtown)
 Complexe Desjardins
 Galeries d'Anjou (Anjou)
 Fairview Pointe-Claire (Pointe-Claire)
 Montreal Eaton Centre — combined with Complexe Les Ailes as of 2018
Norgate shopping centre (Saint-Laurent) — first mall in Canada
 Place Montréal Trust
 Place Versailles
 Place Vertu (Saint-Laurent)
 Promenades Cathédrale

Greater Montreal
 Laval
 Carrefour Laval
 Centre Laval
 Brossard
 Champlain Mall
 Place Portobello
 Quartier DIX30
 Longueuil
 Centre Jacques-Cartier
 Place Longueuil
 Pointe-Claire
 Fairview Pointe-Claire
 Rosemere, Quebec
 Place Rosemère
 Saint-Bruno-de-Montarville
 Promenades Saint-Bruno
Saint-Jérôme
Carrefour du Nord
Sorel-Tracy
Les Promenades de Sorel

Quebec City area
Quebec City
 Galeries de la Capitale
 Laurier Québec
 Fleur de Lys centre commercial
 Place Sainte-Foy
  Lévis
 Les Galeries Chagnon
  Saint-Georges
 Carrefour Saint-Georges

Other Quebec malls 
Chicoutimi
Place du Royaume
Gatineau
Les Promenades de l'Outaouais
 Les Galeries de Hull
Granby
Galeries de Granby
Sherbrooke
Carrefour de l'Estrie

Saskatchewan
Regina
SmartCentres Regina (Golden Mile Shopping Centre)
Saskatoon
 The Centre
 Confederation Mall
 The Mall at Lawson Heights
 Market Mall
 Midtown Plaza
 Preston Crossing

Northern Canada
Northwest Territories
Centre Square Mall

See also
 List of largest enclosed shopping malls in Canada
 List of shopping malls in the United States

References

Notes

Canada
Shopping malls
Shopping malls